Bohuslav Sobotka (born 23 October 1971) is a Czech politician and lawyer who served as the Prime Minister of the Czech Republic from January 2014 to December 2017 and Leader of the Czech Social Democratic Party (ČSSD) from 2010 until his resignation in June 2017. He was Member of the Chamber of Deputies (MP) from 1996 to 2018. Sobotka also served as minister of Finance from 2002 to 2006.

Sobotka was born in Telnice but soon moved with his family to Slavkov u Brna. He studied law at the Masaryk University in Brno and earned magister degree in 1995. After the fall of communism he helped rebuild Czech Social Democratic Party (ČSSD) and became a member. Sobotka also co-founded Young Social Democrats, a youth wing of the ČSSD. He was first elected to the Chamber of Deputies in the 1996 legislative election.

After the formation of the Cabinet of Vladimír Špidla in 2002, Sobotka was appointed Finance Minister and then in 2003, he was promoted to the position of the Deputy Prime Minister, reappointed Finance Minister in both cabinets of Social Democratic Prime Ministers Stanislav Gross and Jiří Paroubek. In 2005, he was appointed the First Deputy Prime Minister in Paroubek's government. After the 2006 legislative election, Sobotka became opposition MP and in 2011 he was elected as the Leader of the Social Democrats, and thus stood as the Leader of the Opposition to the Cabinet of Petr Nečas.

Following the 2013 snap election, Sobotka was appointed prime minister on 17 January 2014 by the President and twelve days later formed centre-left Coalition Government consisting of ČSSD, ANO 2011 and KDU-ČSL. His government introduced series of measures aimed at tackling tax evasion, such as electronic registration of sales or VAT control system, strengthened relations with China, reformed the police, repealed the civil service act and enforced the smoking ban. He also frequently clashed with President Miloš Zeman regarding the Russian intervention in Ukraine and resulting sanctions, domestic policy and Sobotka's withdrawn resignation in May 2017. Sobotka is the first prime minister in 15 years and the third in the history of the Czech Republic to finish his full term.

On 14 June 2017, Sobotka announced his resignation as Leader of ČSSD due to low opinion polling prior to the 2017 legislative election but opted to stay on as prime minister and he was re-elected MP in his South Moravia and in December 2017 was succeeded by Andrej Babiš. On 31 March 2018, Sobotka resigned from the Chamber of Deputies citing personal reasons.

Youth
He comes from Telnice. His family moved to Slavkov u Brna in the early 1980s. There he completed Primary School Tyršova. He studied at Gymnasium Bučovice from 1986 to 1990. He studied at Masaryk University where he received a Master's degree in Law.

Political career
Sobotka was first elected to the Chamber of Deputies in 1996. From 2002 to 2006, he was Finance Minister of the Czech Republic.  Sobotka was also a Deputy Prime Minister from 2003 to 2004 and from 2005 to 2006.

Minister of Finance

As the minister of finance he formed an advisory body of economists. It later became the National Economic Council of Czech government. His austerity policy included dismissal of employees and restrictions on savings accounts and health benefits, a policy he later criticized. When Jiří Paroubek became the new prime minister in 2005, Sobotka reduced his restrictions which led to an increase in the deficit.

Sobotka was elected to the chamber again in 2006 but his party lost the election and went into opposition. Sobotka became a Minister of Finance in a Shadow Cabinet of Social Democrats. His party won legislative election in 2010 but failed to form a governing coalition and remained in opposition.

Sobotka then served as interim leader of ČSSD after the resignation of Jiří Paroubek following the election. He also briefly served as interim chairman in 2006, after the resignation of Stanislav Gross. Sobotka was elected the chairman of the party on 18 March 2011 when he defeated Michal Hašek who became the First Deputy Chairman. On 18 March 2011, Sobotka was officially elected the party chairman.

Leader of ČSSD 
Sobotka led his party in the legislative elections of 2013. The party won the election, gaining 20.45% of votes. The formation of a new government was marked by a conflict between Bohuslav Sobotka and Michal Hašek who, along his allies from the Party, attended a secret post-election meeting with the Czech President Miloš Zeman. They called on Sobotka to resign due to the party's poor election result. Hašek and his allies also eliminated Sobotka from the team negotiating the next government. The secret meeting was later revealed and Hašek was accused of publicly lying about it. It led to public protests in the country in support of Sobotka, which in turn led to Hašek's retreat and new government-coalition negotiations led by Sobotka. After leading his party for some seven years, Bohuslav Sobotka resigned on 14 June 2017 as the Leader of the Social Democratic Party after some opinion polls showed his party with support of 10% saying that “party has to undergo deeper changes, so that it would be able to better address people and to mobilize its supporters and members” ahead of the 2017 legislative election. However, Sobotka decided to compete in the election as the leader of the party in the South Moravian Region. After his resignation, Minister of Interior Milan Chovanec has assumed the position of acting Leader of the ČSSD, while Minister of Foreign Affairs Lubomír Zaorálek became the party candidate for Prime Minister.

Prime Minister (2014–17)
Sobotka was designated as prime minister on 17 January 2014 and appointed, alongside his Cabinet, by President Miloš Zeman on 29 January 2014. His cabinet consisted of members of the coalition government – the ČSSD, ANO 2011, and Christian and Democratic Union–Czechoslovak People's Party.

He was the 11th Prime Minister of the Czech Republic and the 1st left-wing Prime Minister after 6 years of right-wing political control in the Czech Republic. Sobotka's government coalition had in the Chamber of Deputies 111 seats out of 200 and his ČSSD had 50 seats.

Bohuslav Sobotka's views on the European Union and the Czech Republic's membership in the European Union as Prime Minister were relatively positive. Sobotka noted that membership of the Czech Republic in the European Union is a benefit. He has also said that membership provides better security measures and economic stability. However, in early 2016, Sobotka said there would be a national debate on the country's place in the European Union in the case of British withdrawal from it.

On 26 May 2015, he and his coalition government faced the first attempt to overthrow the Government when opposition called on vote of no-confidence to the Government of the Czech Republic because of Finance Minister of the Czech Republic Andrej Babiš. The attempt was unsuccessful as Members of Parliament did not support the vote of no confidence in the current Government.

In December 2016, Sobotka called for higher corporate taxes, saying: “The way taxation is set up right now it only obliges the big and rich players, who export their profits out of the Czech Republic. Annually, these sums amount to 200 to 300 billion [crowns].”

On 2 May 2017, Sobotka announced that he would resign because he could not bear responsibility for Finance Minister Andrej Babiš. Sobotka stated that Babiš failed to clear up questions surrounding questionable financial transactions connected to his business activity. Sobotka changed his mind on 5 May 2017 and instead decided to fire Babiš from his cabinet.

On 15 June 2017, Bohuslav Sobotka resigned as party leader of ČSSD.

On 5 December 2017, Sobotka's Cabinet resigned following heavy party losses in the general elections in October. Subsequently Andrej Babiš was appointed prime minister on 6 December 2017, and his new government assumed office on 13 December 2017.

Post-premiership

Sobotka resided to his hometown Vyškov in January 2018 and stated that he plans to restart his political career. Members of local ČSSD stated they don't intend for him to run in the upcoming municipal election.

On 22 March 2018, Sobotka announced that he would resign as a member of the Chamber of Deputies (MP) effective 1 April 2018.

Personal life 
Sobotka was married from 2003 till 2018 to Olga Sobotková. He has 2 sons - David (2003) and Martin (2009). Prime Minister Sobotka likes to read historical mystery, sci-fi, and contemporary literature. He also likes attending theater performances and going to the cinema where he prefers Czech films.

References

External links

  (Campaign) 
 Curriculum Vitae 
  

|-

|-

|-

1971 births
People from Brno-Country District
Finance ministers of the Czech Republic
Government ministers of the Czech Republic
Leaders of the Czech Social Democratic Party
Living people
Masaryk University alumni
Prime Ministers of the Czech Republic
Czech Social Democratic Party MPs
Czech Social Democratic Party prime ministers
Members of the Chamber of Deputies of the Czech Republic (2017–2021)
Members of the Chamber of Deputies of the Czech Republic (2013–2017)
Members of the Chamber of Deputies of the Czech Republic (2010–2013)
Members of the Chamber of Deputies of the Czech Republic (2006–2010)
Members of the Chamber of Deputies of the Czech Republic (2002–2006)
Members of the Chamber of Deputies of the Czech Republic (1998–2002)
Members of the Chamber of Deputies of the Czech Republic (1996–1998)